Rodrigo Sánchez Mercado (died 25 January 1548) was a Roman Catholic prelate who served as Bishop of Ávila (1530–1548) and Bishop of Mallorca (1511–1530).

Biography
On 29 October 1511, Rodrigo Sánchez Mercado was selected by the King of Spain and confirmed by Pope Julius II as Bishop of Mallorca. On 12 January 1530, he was appointed by Pope Clement VII as Bishop of Ávila. He served as Bishop of Ávila until his death on 25 January 1548.

References

External links and additional sources
 (for Chronology of Bishops) 
 (for Chronology of Bishops) 
 (for Chronology of Bishops) 
 (for Chronology of Bishops) 

1548 deaths
Bishops appointed by Pope Julius II
Bishops appointed by Pope Clement VII